Luke Bretherton is a British theologian and Robert E. Cushman Distinguished Professor of Moral & Political Theology at Duke University. His book The Conditions and Possibilities of Faithful Witness was awarded the 2013 Michael Ramsey Prize for Theological Writing.

Books
Christianity and Contemporary Politics
The Conditions and Possibilities of Faithful Witness
Christ and the Common Life: Political Theology and the Case for Democracy

References

21st-century American philosophers
Philosophy academics
Living people
American religion academics
Duke University faculty
Year of birth missing (living people)